Kiraatham is a 1985 Indian Malayalam film,  directed by K. S. Gopalakrishnan. The film stars Ratheesh, Santhosh and Captain Raju in the lead roles. The film has musical score by Kannur Rajan.

Cast

Ratheesh as C. I. Hassan
Santhosh as Murali
Prathapachandran as Prathapan
Bahadoor as Musliyar
Bheeman Raghu as Radhakrishnan
Devan as Artist
Justin as Chief engineer Prabhakaran Nair
Kaduvakulam Antony as Narayanan Pilla
Poojappura Ravi as Kuttan Pilla
Sudheer as Adv. Ramakrishnan Nair
Vincent as Magistrate
Pattom Sadan as Santhappan
Anuradha as Anu
Valsala Menon as Kamalam
Lalithasree as Mariya
Khadeeja as Mariyamma
Silk Smitha as Dancer

Soundtrack
The music was composed by Kannur Rajan and the lyrics were written by Bharanikkavu Sivakumar.

References

External links
 

1985 films
1980s Malayalam-language films